Christopher J. Elias is the former president and CEO of the Program for Appropriate Technology in Health, also known as PATH, a nonprofit organization that improves global health by ensuring that innovations in science and technology are available to low income groups and developing countries.

Education
Elias received his MD from Creighton University, completed his post-graduate training in internal medicine at the University of California, San Francisco, and received his MPH from the University of Washington.

Career
Elias has worked as a senior associate at the International Programs Division of the Population Council. He served as country representative of Thailand.

In October 2011, the Bill & Melinda Gates Foundation formally announced the appointment of Elias to the position of president of its global development program. In this role, Elias is responsible of leading the foundation's efforts in developing countries to overcome hunger, poverty and disease.

Other activities
 Exemplars in Global Health, Member of the Senior Advisory Board (since 2020)
 Creighton University, member of the board of trustees
 Centers for Disease Control and Prevention (CDC), member of the advisory committee to the director
 University of Washington, member of the global health external advisory board
 Family Planning 2020 (FP2020), co-chair of the reference group
 Scaling Up Nutrition Movement, member of the lead group (since 2016, appointed by United Nations Secretary-General Ban Ki-moon)

Recognition
 2005 – Social Entrepreneur of the Year, awarded by the Schwab Foundation

References

External links

 Podcast Interview with Christopher Elias Social Innovation Conversations, June 20, 2008
 Gates Foundation bio
 "Event 201 Players"
 Event 201 press release from World Economic Forum
 "A WORLD AT RISK" Global Preparedness Monitoring Board 2019 annual report, W.H.O. (Elias and Fauci are on p. 42)
 "A WORLD IN DISORDER" Global Preparedness Monitoring Board 2020 annual report, W.H.O. (Elias and Fauci are on p. 45)

 
Living people
American nonprofit chief executives
Year of birth missing (living people)
Creighton University alumni
University of California, San Francisco alumni
University of Washington School of Public Health alumni